Thomas Allen Schwartz (born March 7, 1945) is a retired United States Army four-star general who commanded the United States Army Forces Command from 1998 to 1999 and United States Forces Korea from 1999 to 2002.

Education
Schwartz attended Cretin High School (now Cretin-Derham Hall High School) in Saint Paul, Minnesota.

Military career
Schwartz was born on March 7, 1945, in St. Paul, Minnesota. He was commissioned in the infantry following graduation from the United States Military Academy in 1967. He served as a platoon leader and company commander with the 2nd Battalion, 505th Infantry in Vietnam from August 1968 to October 1969, earning both a Silver Star and a Purple Heart. In addition to Forces Command and United States Forces Korea, Schwartz also commanded III Corps and the 4th Infantry Division from October 1993 to November 1995.

Schwartz holds master's degrees from Duke University and the Naval War College. He is also a graduate of the Infantry Officer Basic Course, Ranger School, the Armor Officer Advanced Course, and the Armed Forces Staff College.

Awards and decorations

He received an honorary Doctor of Laws degree from the University of Maryland University College in 2002.

Post-military
In 2004, Schwartz became chairman of the board of directors of the Military Child Education Coalition an organization co-founded by his wife Sandy and other military spouses. He sits on the advisory board of Azbell Electronics.

References

Living people
United States Army generals
United States Military Academy alumni
United States Army personnel of the Vietnam War
Recipients of the Distinguished Service Medal (US Army)
Recipients of the Silver Star
Recipients of the Legion of Merit
1945 births
People from Saint Paul, Minnesota
Duke University alumni
Recipients of the Air Medal
Recipients of the Defense Superior Service Medal
Recipients of the Meritorious Service Medal (United States)
Commanders, United States Forces Korea
Military personnel from Minnesota